Tiurida (meaning "Glory") is the fifth studio album by the German Viking metal band Falkenbach, released in January 2011 via Napalm Records. It was recorded with the same session musicians as the previous two Falkenbach records, Ok nefna tysvar Ty (2003) and Heralding - The Fireblade (2005). It was released as a jewelcase, digipack, deluxe limited edition (containing the digipack plus a Falkenbach logo pendant), vinyl (in three variants - black, golden and white vinyl - and with different cover artwork) and download.

Track listing

"Asaland" is a re-recording (and re-writing, essentially) of a song originally from the "Laeknishendr" demo released in 1995. The track is present on the digipack, vinyl and deluxe editions.

Personnel
Vratyas Vakyas - clean vocals, choirs, guitars, keyboards

Additional personnel
Hagalaz - guitars, acoustic guitars, keyboards
Tyrann - screams
Alboin - bass
Boltthorn - drums, percussion
Patrick Damiani - engineering
Florian - layout
Christophe Szpajdel - logo

Notes
  – Official Falkenbach forum, announcement
  – Napalm Records artist page
  — Encyclopaedia Metallum entry

2011 albums
Falkenbach albums
Napalm Records albums